California's state general elections were held November 5, 1996. Necessary primary elections were held on March 26, 1996. Up for election were all eighty (80) seats of the State Assembly, twenty (20) seats of the State Senate (half of the forty (40) total seats), and fifteen (15) statewide ballot measures.

California State Legislature elections

State Senate

There are 40 seats in the State Senate. For this election, candidates running in odd-numbered districts ran for four-year terms.

State Assembly

All 80 biennially elected seats of the State Assembly were up for election this year. Each seat has a two-year term. The Democrats retained control of the State Assembly.

Statewide ballot propositions
Fifteen (15) ballot propositions qualified to be listed on the general election ballot in California. Eight measures passed while seven failed.

Proposition 204
(Safe, Clean, Reliable Water Supply Act.) Proposition 204 passed with 62.84% of the vote.

Proposition 205
(Youthful and Adult Offender Local Facilities Bond Act of 1996.) Proposition 205 failed with 40.62% of the vote.

Proposition 206
(Veterans' Bond Act of 1996.) Proposition 206 passed with 53.56% of the vote.

Proposition 207
(Attorneys. Fees. Right to Negotiate. Frivolous Lawsuits.) Proposition 207 failed with 34.22% of the vote.

Proposition 208
(Campaign Contributions and Spending Limits. Restricts Lobbyists.) Proposition 208 passed with 61.27% of the vote.

Proposition 209

(Prohibition Against Discrimination or Preferential Treatment by State and Other Public Entities.) Proposition 209 passed with 54.55% of the vote.

Proposition 210
(Minimum Wage Increase.) Proposition 210 passed with 61.45% of the vote.

Proposition 211
(Attorney-Client Fee Arrangements. Securities Fraud. Lawsuits.) Proposition 211 failed with 25.65% of the vote.

Proposition 212
(Campaign Contributions and Spending Limits. Repeals Gift and Honoraria Limits. Restricts Lobbyists.) Proposition 212 failed with 49.16% of the vote.

Proposition 213
(Limitation on Recovery to Felons, Uninsured Motorists, Drunk Drivers.) Proposition 213 passed with 76.83% of the vote.

Proposition 214
(Health Care. Consumer Protection. Initiative Statute.) Proposition 214 failed with 42.04% of the vote.

Proposition 215

(Medical Use of Marijuana.)  Proposition 215 passed with 55.58% of the vote.

Proposition 216
(Health Care. Consumer Protection. Taxes on Corporate Restructuring.) Proposition 216 failed with 38.76% of the vote.

Proposition 217
(Top Income Tax Brackets. Reinstatement. Revenues to Local Agencies.) Proposition 217 failed with 49.20% of the vote.

Proposition 218

(Voter Approval for Local Government Taxes. Limitations on Fees, Assessments, and Charges.) Proposition 218 passed with 56.55% of the vote.

See also
California State Legislature
California State Assembly
California State Assembly elections, 1996
California State Senate
California State Senate elections, 1996
Districts in California
Political party strength in U.S. states
Political party strength in California
Elections in California
California Proposition 209
California Proposition 215
California Proposition 218
California Proposition 218 Local Initiative Power

References

External links 
Official election results form the California Secretary of State
California Legislative District Maps (1911-Present)
RAND California Election Returns: District Definitions

 
California